Balarama is the elder brother of Krishna in Hinduism and Jainism

Balarama may also refer to:

 Balarama (elephant), the lead elephant of the Mysore Dasara procession
 Bālarama (magazine), an Indian comic book in the Malayalam language
 Balarama Dasa, Odia poet
 Balarama Deva, 16th century ruler of Western Odisha
 Balarama Holness, former professional Canadian footballer

See also
Baladeva (disambiguation)